Charles Major may refer to:

 Charles Major (writer) (1856–1913), American lawyer and novelist
 Charles E. Major (1859–1954), New Zealand politician of the Liberal Party
 Charles Henry Major (1860–1933), British judge
 Charles Beautron Major (1875–1966), Canadian lawyer, judge and political